Bosatta is an Italian surname. Notable people with the surname include:

Dina Bosatta (1858–1887), Italian Roman Catholic professed nun 
Renato Bosatta (born 1938), Italian rower

Italian-language surnames